Vaux-en-Beaujolais (literally Vaux in Beaujolais) is a commune in the Rhône department in eastern France.  It is the inspiration for the fictional town of Clochemerle.

See also
Communes of the Rhône department

References

External links

Vaux en Beaujolais website (in French)

Communes of Rhône (department)
Beaujolais (province)